A listing or program listing is a printed list of lines of computer code or digital data (in human-readable form).

Use cases
Listings are commonly used in education and computer-related books to show examples of code.

In the early days of programming, it was used to hand-check a program and as permanent storage. It was also common in 1970s and 1980s computer enthusiast magazines (for instance Creative Computing) and books like BASIC Computer Games for type-in programs. 

Today, hard copy listings are seldom used because display screens can present more lines than formerly, programs tend to be modular, storage in soft copy is considered preferable to hard copy, and digital material is easily transmitted via networks, or on disks or tapes. Furthermore, data sets tend to be too large to be conveniently put on paper, and they are more easily searched in soft-copy form.

Assembly-code listings are occasionally analysed by programmers who want to understand how a compiler is translating their source code into assembly language. For example, the GNU C Compiler (gcc) will produce an assembly code listing if it is invoked with the command-line option -S.

Listings of computer programs are still important in US patent law. They are defined as follows in the Manual of Patent Examining Procedure:

References

External links
WordPress Price List Builder

Source code
Text editor features